The Texas Energy Museum is a museum in Beaumont, Texas in the United States. The museum was formed in 1987 to tell the story of oil through state of the art exhibits including talking robotic characters.  The museum opened on January 10, 1990, the anniversary of the Spindletop gusher.

The museum is part of a concentration of several museums in the downtown Beaumont area.  It is located adjacent to the Tyrrell Historical Library and the Art Museum of Southeast Texas.  The Beaumont Children's Museum is temporarily located across the street in the Beaumont Civic Center. The Edison Museum and Fire Museum of Texas are within a few blocks.

The museum

The museum has two floors of displays.  The interactive exhibits "...focus on the geology, history and production of oil..." The museum has several presentations about the Spindletop oil discovery and production.  Collections include a combination of items from the Spindletop Museum of Lamar University and the Western Company of North America Museum.

Museum exhibits include:
Source:
Formation - "Oil was formed over millions of years ago..."
Exploration - "By studying rock formations...petroleum geologists can predict a potential oil site..."
Drilling - "The mechanics of oil well drilling are simple..."
Refining - "...crude oil is transformed into consumer products..."
Spindletop - "The discovery of oil at Spindletop near Beaumont, Texas in 1901 revolutionized the oil industry..."

Hours and admission
Source:
Hours: Tuesday-Saturday 9:00 am – 5:00 pm
Sunday 1:00 pm – 5:00 pm

Admission: Adults $5.00, Children (6-12) $3.00, Seniors (65 & over) $3.00

See also

 List of petroleum museums
 American Oil&Gas Historical Society Museums 
 List of museums in East Texas
 Spindletop-Gladys City Boomtown Museum
 Spindletop
 Texas oil boom
 Anthony Francis Lucas
 Patillo Higgins
 McFaddin-Ward House History
 McFaddin-Ward House
 Texas History Online - Spindletop Oilfield
 CSpan3 LCV Cities Tour - Beaumont: Texas Energy Museum YouTube video
 CSpan3 LCV Cities Tour - Beaumont: Spindletop YouTube video
 Spindletop Oil Boom YouTube video

References

External links
Texas Energy Museum

Industry museums in Texas
Museums in Beaumont, Texas
History museums in Texas
Petroleum museums
Museums established in 1987
1987 establishments in Texas
Energy museums in the United States